Daddy, I'm a Zombie is a 2011 Spanish animated comedy-drama film directed by Joan Espinach and Ricardo Ramón. The film premiered 25 November 2011 at the Gijón Film Festival in Spain. Spanish actress Paula Ribó voiced the main character of Dixie and Kimberly Wharton voiced the character in its English adaptation.

Plot 
The film follows Dixie Grim, a thirteen-year-old gothic girl. Her father is a recently divorced mortician who tries to connect with his daughter, but she seems to want nothing to do with him. She has a giant crush on Ray, a boy in school who doesn't seem to know she exists. All goes wrong when she witnesses her best friend seemingly flirting with Ray. Heartbroken, she runs away from the scene. Shortly after, a tree falls in a forest and seemingly kills her. 

Dixie wakes up in a graveyard and discovers that she has become a zombie. She befriends an Egyptian mummy named Isis and finds that she can wield the Azoth, a powerful magic amulet. The two are curious to try out and control its power, as it is capable of returning a zombie to the moment before their death, and decide to find another zombie to use as a test subject. Along the way they meet Gonner, a zombie pirate who charms Dixie and steals her necklace, breaking her heart and tearing apart her body in the process. She is also separated from Isis. Unbeknownst to Dixie and Isis, Gonner had only stolen the Azoth to protect her from the evil witch Nebulosa. 

Dixie is put back together by a friendly zombie, who reluctantly takes her to Nebulosa. Reaching the witch requires that she go through a carnival funhouse where she must face her pain and fears, which Dixie manages to overcome. She also reconciles with and rescues Gonner after overhearing him admit that he truly loved her. Dixie also recovers the Azoth and with Gonner. They find Isis with Nebulosa, who is threatening to destroy her. Dixie manages to unintentionally open a portal that allows the three to escape Nebulosa's clutches. Dixie wakes up to find herself alive. She initially believes that everything was a dream, but thinks otherwise after learning that Isis and Gonner did actually exist. Isis managed to live and married King Tut, while Gonner gave up piracy to become a poet.

Voice actors

Spanish release 

 Paula Ribó as Dixie Malasombra
 Núria Trifol as Isis, Julia
 Ivan Labanda as Gonner
 Luis Posada as Ricardo Malasombra, Vitriol
 Roser Batalla as Nigreda / Sofía Malasombra 
 Clara Schwarze as Brianna, Lilianna
 Elisabeth Bergalló as Piroska
 Albert Mieza as Fizcko
 Manuel Osto as History Professor
 Francesc Belda as Thorko

English release 

 Kimberly Wharton as Dixie Grim
 Ratana as Isis
 MJ Lallo as Gonner, Sophia Grim
 Doug Gochman as Phil Grim, Vitriol
 Karen McCarthy as Nebulosa
 Liz Joseph as Piroska
 Heather Downey as Allyssa
 Tracey Charles as Melissa, Julia
 Danny Katiana as Frizcko, Thorko
 Josh Snyder as History Teacher

Recognition

Reception
Starburst Magazine panned the film overall, stating that although the film did have good music and cinematography, that overall it "isn't funny, it isn't frightening and every set-piece action scene is a dismal failure." Common Sense Media was somewhat more positive, rating it at three out of five stars.

Awards and nominations
 2012, won 'Enfants Terribles Award' at Gijon International Film Festival
 2012, Goya Awards nomination for 'Best Animated Film'
 2013, Gaudí Awards nomination for 'Best Animated Feature'
 2013, El Círculo de Escritores Cinematográficos (Cinema Writers Circle Awards, Spain) nomination for 'Best Animated Film'

Sequel
A sequel entitled Mummy, I'm a Zombie] which had a later Spanish re-titling to Dixie y la rebelión zombi, was given a theatrical release on 7 November 2014 in Spain. Kim Wharton returned to voice Dixie for its English release.

References

External links
 

2011 films
Zombie comedy films
2011 comedy-drama films
2010s adventure comedy films
2010s fantasy comedy films
Spanish animated films
2010s Spanish-language films
2011 computer-animated films
2010s Spanish films